Cahangir bey Novruzov or Cihangir Berker (born 1894, Baku, Russian Empire - d. Izmir, Türkiye, 1958) was a Turkish major general of Azerbaijani origin.

Life 
Cahangir bey Yusif bəy oglu Novruzov was born in 1894 in Baku in a military family. In April 1920, the commander of a cavalry regiment in the rank of capital fought against the invading Bolshevik army, after the Red Army occupation, having left Azerbaijan, he moved to Iran. After a short stay there, together with the cavalry regiment, he moved to Erzurum and joined the army of Kazim Karabekir Pasha. In 1921, during the battle near Berna near Benliahmet, initiated by the Dashnaks, he showed great heroism by inflicting cannon shots on enemy aircraft. For his courageous behavior in battles, the Turkish command nicknamed him "Berker" - "berk er", which means a warlike man. Subsequently, he successfully fought on military campaigns against Sheikh Said and Agra, in 1928 he entered the Military School to improve his education. After successfully graduating from Topchular school in 1929, he was awarded the rank of colonel. On August 30, 1948, he was awarded the honorary rank of major general for achievements in the military field as commander of a cannon regiment in Kutahya. He worked as commander of the Izmir fortified region and rear. In 1953, he resigned due to age. Until the end of his life he lived in a simple house, devoid of any luxury, built by him in Bornova. 

He had three daughters from his wife Vazifa khanum. Retired cavalry colonel Baba Behbud, who worked for many years under the command of the general, writes in the 4-5th issue of 1958 of the Azerbaijan magazine published in Turkey that the esteemed General Jahangir-bek Berker Novruzov was devoted to the art of war all his life . Major-General Jahangir-bey Berker Novruzov died on June 17, 1958, at 5 pm in his apartment from heart disease.

See also 
 Nuri Berköz
 Samad bey Rafibeyli

References

Sources 
 

1894 births
1958 deaths
20th century in Azerbaijan
People from the Russian Empire
Turkish military personnel
Turkish people of Azerbaijani descent
Azerbaijani military personnel
Military personnel from Baku
Azerbaijani emigrants to Turkey